Lowell Thomas (born January 17, 1941) is an American film and television actor. He is perhaps best known for playing baby-faced Pvt. Billy Nelson in the American drama television series Combat!.

Life and career 
Lowell was born in Philadelphia, Pennsylvania. He began his career in 1962, first appearing in the anthology television series The Twilight Zone in the episode "The Changing of the Guard", in which he appeared with actor Darryl Richard. Lowell then appeared in the sitcom television series The Lucy Show, where he played the recurring role of Alan Harper. He then made two appearances in the legal drama television series Perry Mason in the episodes "The Case of the Careless Kidnapper" and "The Case of the Lurid Letter".  He also appeared several times on The Carol Burnett Show as an uncredited stock player.

In the same year, Lowell appeared in the 1962 film Mr. Hobbs Takes a Vacation, which starred James Stewart and Maureen O'Hara. He also appeared in the film The Manchurian Candidate, which starred Frank Sinatra, Laurence Harvey and Janet Leigh. He played as David Woolf in the 1964 film The Carpetbaggers. Lowell then played as Canoe Henderson in the 1965 film That Darn Cat!. He also played the starring role of Jasper in the 1967 film The Gnome-Mobile. Lowell guest-starred in television programs including Gunsmoke, Bonanza, Death Valley Days, Daniel Boone, Quincy, M.E., The Invaders and The Big Valley. His final credit was from the 1999 film Love and Action in Chicago.

In later years, Lowell taught acting at private schools in the Los Angeles area.

References

External links 

Rotten Tomatoes profile

1941 births
Living people
People from Philadelphia
Male actors from Philadelphia
American male film actors
American male television actors
20th-century American male actors